William M. Marsh (born March 28, 1958) is an American politician serving as a member of the New Hampshire House of Representatives from the Carroll 8th district. He was first elected to the State House in 2016 as a Republican.

Early life
Marsh was born in Pennsylvania and he graduated from Shady Side Academy in 1976. He graduated from Dartmouth College in 1979 and Dartmouth Medical School in 1982.

Career
On September 14, 2021, Marsh, an ophthalmologist and the Brookfield health officer, switched parties from Republican to Democratic because his Republican colleagues had organized a rally against the Biden administration's new vaccine mandates (see ).

In February 2022, Marsh announced that he was going to challenge Jeb Bradley in the New Hampshire Senate.

References

Living people
Democratic Party members of the New Hampshire House of Representatives
21st-century American politicians
1958 births
Shady Side Academy alumni
Dartmouth College alumni
Geisel School of Medicine alumni